Marie Louise Amiet, (April 17, 1879–1944) was a French painter and illustrator.

Biography 

Amiet was a student of the illustrator and engraver Josef Kaspar Sattler. A member of the Society of Alsation Artists, around 1912 she illustrated Le Rhin by Victor Hugo.

Collections 

Musée de la Chartreuse de Molsheim
Musée du Louvre département des Arts graphiques
Musée d'Art moderne et contemporain (Strasbourg)

Publications 

 La Condamnation de Jeanne d'Arc vue à la lumière des grands événements du Moyen Âge, Nouvelles éditions du siècle, 1934

References 

19th-century French women artists
French women painters
20th-century French women artists
French women illustrators
1879 births
1944 deaths